Choristoneura psoricodes is a species of moth of the family Tortricidae. It is found in South Africa.

The wingspan is 19.5 mm for males and 21–23 mm for females. The ground colour of the forewings is cream, slightly suffused and densely strigulated (finely streaked) with yellow brown and with yellowish-brown markings. The hindwings are brownish cream, but darker on the peripheries and with brownish-grey strigulation.

References

Endemic moths of South Africa
Moths described in 1911
Choristoneura